Dennis Weiland (born 30 August 1974) is a German former professional footballer who played as a midfielder. He spent two seasons in the Bundesliga with 1. FSV Mainz 05. His brother Niclas is also a former footballer.

Honours 
Borussia Dortmund
 DFB-Supercup: 1996

References

External links
 

1974 births
Living people
Footballers from Hanover
German footballers
Association football midfielders
SV Arminia Hannover players
Borussia Dortmund players
Borussia Dortmund II players
Rot-Weiß Oberhausen players
VfL Osnabrück players
1. FSV Mainz 05 players
Eintracht Braunschweig players
SV Waldhof Mannheim players
Bundesliga players
2. Bundesliga players